Berge Sæberg (12 July 1923 – 1 April 2010) was a Norwegian politician for the Centre Party.

He served as a deputy representative to the Parliament of Norway from Hordaland during the terms 1969–1973, 1973–1977 and 1977–1981. In total he met during 44 days of parliamentary session.

References

1923 births
2010 deaths
Deputy members of the Storting
Centre Party (Norway) politicians
Hordaland politicians